Russian Foundation for Basic Research (RFBR) is a national science funding body of the Russian government created on 27 April 1992 by Decree of the President of Russia.

Activities 

The Russian Foundation for Basic Research financially sponsors conferences and research, provides collective bargaining in negotiating access to research databases for Russian research institutions, and co-hosts the Scopus Awards with Elsevier for Russian scientists who score high in Elsevier's academic productivity and citation metrics and are strongly involved in RFBR’s programs and grants.

RFBR research grants are usually only available to Russian researchers and their international collaborators.

International collaboration 
RFBR collaborates with other research foundations around the world, including CRDF Global, the National Science Foundation and National Institutes of Health in the United States, the French National Center for Scientific Research, the German Research Foundation the Royal Society of the United Kingdom, the Iran National Science Foundation, the Indian Ministry of Science and Technology, the Ministry of Science, Technology and Environment of the Republic of Cuba, the Academy of Finland, the Research Council of Norway, and the King Abdulaziz City for Science and Technology in Saudi Arabia.

International joint projects 
 BRICS STI Framework Programme
 BRICS is an association of the governments of Brazil, Russia, India, China and South Africa which have met annually since 2009. In 2015, BRICS members completed a memorandum of understanding on collaboration in science, technology, and innovation. The Russian Foundation for Basic Research is one of several Russian state agencies which are implementing these collaborations.

 Lake Elgygytgyn
 While no Russian agency is a member of the International Continental Scientific Drilling Program, RFBR financially sponsors the International Drilling Program's work at Lake Elgygytgyn.
 e-ASIA Joint Research Program
 The Russian Foundation for Basic Research is a member of the e-ASIA Joint Research Program, an effort to promote innovation in science and technology in the East Asian region as a means of spurring economic development.
 Global Research Council
The RFBR be co-hosted the 2018 annual meeting of the Global Research Council with the National Research Foundation of Korea.

Presidents 
 Vladislav Panchenko, 2008-

Related Russian government organizations 
For a chart of Russian government organizations on science and technology, see 

 Presidential Council for Science and Education 
 Ministry of Education and Science of the Russian Federation 
 Federal Agency for Scientific Organizations - Created in 2013 and controls Russian Academy of Sciences property
 Russian Science Foundation - Established by Vladimir Putin in 2013 to support basic research and the development of science research teams
 Russian Academy of Sciences - "Russia’s primary basic-research organization"
 Skolkovo Foundation - "Russia's flagship science foundation and a pet project of... Dmitry Medvedev" which primarily has been developing a technology-focused district outside Moscow,
 Rosatom - Involved in nuclear energy research
 Rusnano - a nanotechnology investment company created by the Russian government
 Russian Foundation for Humanities
 Foundation for Assistance to Small Innovative Enterprises - founded in 1994
 Russian Fund for Technological Development
 State Committee on Science and Technology - Active until at least 1998 See State Committee of the Soviet Union.

Notes

References

Further reading 
  
 
 
  Publisher's webpage

External links

 
ERA-LEARN 2020 Page

1992 establishments in Russia
Foundations based in Russia
Funding bodies
Government agencies established in 1992
Government agencies of Russia
Science and technology in Russia
Scientific organizations based in Russia
Scientific organizations established in 1992
Research funding agencies